Rajab Mbarouk Mohammed (born 2 November 1963) is a Tanzanian CUF politician and Member of Parliament for Ole constituency since 2010.

References

Living people
1963 births
Civic United Front MPs
Tanzanian MPs 2010–2015
Zanzibari politicians